Atrichonotus is a genus of broad-nosed weevils in the beetle family Curculionidae. There are about nine described species in Atrichonotus.

Species
These nine species belong to the genus Atrichonotus:
 Atrichonotus aeniatulus (Berg, 1881) g
 Atrichonotus convexifrons Hustache, 1939 c g
 Atrichonotus marginatus Hustache, 1939 c g
 Atrichonotus minimus Blanchard, 1851 c g
 Atrichonotus obscurus (Hustache, 1947) c g
 Atrichonotus pacificus Kuschel, 1958 c g
 Atrichonotus sordidus Hustache, 1939 c g
 Atrichonotus taeniatulus (Berg, 1881) i c g b (small lucerne weevil)
 Atrichonotus whiteheadi Lanteri, 1995 c g
Data sources: i = ITIS, c = Catalogue of Life, g = GBIF, b = Bugguide.net

References

Further reading

External links

 

Entiminae
Articles created by Qbugbot